Parliamentary elections were held in Estonia on 5 March 1995. The newly elected 101 members of the 8th Riigikogu assembled at Toompea Castle in Tallinn within ten days of the election. The governing parties were heavily defeated, except for the Reform Party, the successor of Estonian Liberal Democratic Party. The biggest winner was election alliance consisting of Coalition Party and its rural allies, which won in a landslide victory. The alliance won 41 seats, which is the best result in Estonian parliamentary election so far.

Results
The National Coalition Party "Fatherland" and the Estonian National Independence Party formed an electoral alliance, but won only eight seats. The Right-Wingers, which included members of Fatherland splinter group Republicans’ and the Conservatives’ People's Party, managed to pass the threshold with exactly 5% share of the vote.

The Social Democrats and Rural Centre Party presented a joined list again and soon after the election formed a new party called the Moderates.

An election newcomer was Our Home is Estonia!, a Russian ethnic minority list. Among the lists that did not pass the threshold were a cartel known as the Fourth Power, formed consisting of the Royalists and Greens.

Aftermath
The defeat of the governing centre-right parties came as no surprise as the coalition parties had already been defeated in the 1993 local elections. The majority of the voters were disenchanted with coalition's shock therapy policies and scandals which had already brought about the dismissal of Prime Minister Mart Laar. Laar's premiership was also characterised with internal fights between coalition partners as well as different groups in his own Fatherland party. This led to a split in 1994, when several groups left Fatherland party. The winning KMÜ, while declaring to represent "right-wing politics", ran on a populist campaign highly critical of the previous center-right governments, accusing them of injustice, pauperization of the people and selling out people's properties. "Fatherland" on the other hand asked in its programme rhetorically, "whether we would like to let to power those who led us under Soviet rule resolutely towards the abyss, do we want back bread cartons and the oppressing embrace of the great Eastern neighbour, do we want hyperinflation and pension queues? Or do we want to continue building up a free and wealthy society?". The main slogan of KMÜ was "Competence, Cooperation, Domestic Peace"; the "Fatherland" ran under slogans "Choose the Right" and "A Choice for the Thinking Person".

After the election, the Coalition Party under the leadership of Tiit Vähi and the rural parties formed government coalition with the Estonian Centre Party. However, the government collapsed in the autumn of 1995 after the so-called Tape scandal. As a result, the Centre Party was replaced by the Reform Party in the government. This coalition, which suffered from internal disagreements and clashes between free-market liberal Reform Party and centre-left rural parties, ended in 1996, when the Reform Party left the government. The Coalition Party and its rural allies continued as a minority government until the next elections in March 1999. The governments under KMÜ generally continued with the free-market reforms and Western integration started under the "Fatherland" governments, with minor changes implemented.

References

External links
Election results on the Estonian Electoral Commission website (in Estonian)

Parliamentary elections in Estonia
Estonia
1995 in Estonia